Bérurier noir is a French punk band active from 1983 to 1989. The band reformed from 2003 to 2006. The band is associated with anarcho-punk.

Discography

Studio albums 
 Macadam massacre (1984)
 Concerto pour détraqués (1985)
 Abracadaboum (1987)	
 Souvent fauché, toujours marteau (1989)
 Invisible (2006)

Live albums 
 Meilleurs extraits des deux concerts a Paris (1983)
 Viva Bertaga (1990)
 Carnaval des agités (1995)
 La Bataille de Pali-Kao (1998)
 Même pas mort (2003)
 L'Opéra des Loups + Chants des meutes (2005)

Compilations 
 Enfoncez l'clown (2003)

Singles & EP 
 Nada/Gloco (1983) (split EP with band Guernica, Bérurier Noir contribute four songs)
 Macadam massacre (1984)
 Nada 84 (1984)
 Nada Nada (1985) (stand-alone release of the Bérurier Noir side of the split single Nada/Gloco)
 Joyeux merdier (1985)
 L'Empereur Tomato Ketchup (1986)
 Ils veulent nous tuer (1988)	
 Nuit Apache (1988)	
 Split Bérurier Noir/Haine Brigade (1988) (split single with band Haine Brigade, Bérurier Noir contribute the song Makhnovtchina)	
 Viêt Nam-Laos-Cambodge (1988)

References

External links
Official band site
Official site of label "Folklore de la zone mondiale"
"Renard" - Live 1989
Allmusic.com entry

French punk rock groups
Musical groups from Paris
Anarcho-punk groups